This is a summary of 2012 in music in the United Kingdom.
In 2012, dance music continued to dominate the charts.

Events
1 January – Musicians honoured in the Queen's New Year Honours list include conductor Antonio Pappano (knighthood), record producer Steve Lillywhite (CBE), composer and conductor Rev Ronald Corp (OBE) and Ralph Allwood (MBE), former director of music at Eton College.
4 June – A Diamond Jubilee Concert is held outside Buckingham Palace on The Mall, London, organised by Gary Barlow as part of Queen Elizabeth II's Diamond Jubilee celebrations. Performers include Gary Barlow, Robbie Williams, Sir Elton John, Sir Paul McCartney, Grace Jones, Alfie Boe, Sir Cliff Richard, Sir Tom Jones, Dame Shirley Bassey and Stevie Wonder.
8-10 June – Download Festival 2012 takes place at Donington Park in Leicestershire. The Jim Marshall main stage is headlined by The Prodigy, Metallica and Black Sabbath, the Zippo encore stage by Slash Featuring Myles Kennedy & The Conspirators, You Me at Six and Rise Against, the Pepsi Max Stage by Devin Townsend Project, The Mission and Periphery, the Red Bull Bedroom Jam Stage by Cancer Bats, Cockney Rejects and William Control, and the Jägermeister Acoustic stage by Yashin, Tyla and Saint Jude.
16 June – Musicians honoured in the Queen's Birthday Honours list include Gary Barlow (OBE), violinist Tasmin Little (OBE) and Gareth Malone (OBE).
27 July – On the opening day of the 2012 Summer Olympics, at 8.15, Martin Creed's controversial work "All The Bells", is performed by the bells of London.
12 August – The 2012 Summer Olympics closing ceremony, also known by the title "A Symphony of British music", takes place at London's Olympic Stadium.  Performers include Take That, One Direction, The Spice Girls, Madness, George Michael, Julian Lloyd Webber, Pet Shop Boys, Ray Davies, Annie Lennox, Kaiser Chiefs and Emeli Sandé.
9 December – James Arthur wins the ninth series of The X Factor. Jahméne Douglas is named runner-up, while Christopher Maloney and Union J finish in third and fourth place respectively.

Artists/groups reformed
 Spice Girls
 911
 Atomic Kitten
 B*Witched
 Five
 Honeyz
 Kitchens Of Distinction
 Liberty X
 Six By Seven
 The Supernaturals

Groups disbanded 
 Westlife
 Jet
 Viva Brother
 The King Blues
 SoundGirl
 Pendulum
 Chumbawamba
 Does It Offend You, Yeah?

Classical music

New works
Peter Maxwell Davies – Symphony No. 9
Howard Goodall – Every Purpose Under the Heaven (The King James Bible Oratorio)
Karl Jenkins – The Peacemakers
Philip Ledger – This Holy Child (cantata)
Philip Moore – "I will lift up mine eyes"

Opera
George Benjamin – Written on Skin
Stephen Crowe – The Francis Bacon Opera
Neil Hannon – Sevastopol,

British music awards

BRIT Awards
The 2012 BRIT Awards were held on 21 February 2012 at The O2 Arena, London and hosted by James Corden. The most notable winners were Adele and Ed Sheeran, both winning two awards.

British Male Solo Artist: Ed Sheeran
British Female Solo Artist: Adele
British Breakthrough Act: Ed Sheeran
British Group: Coldplay
British Single: "What Makes You Beautiful" – One Direction
MasterCard British Album: 21 – Adele
International Male Solo Artist: Bruno Mars
International Female Solo Artist: Rihanna
International Group: Foo Fighters
International Breakthrough Act: Lana Del Rey
British Producer: Ethan Johns
Critics' Choice: Emeli Sandé
Outstanding Contribution to Music: Blur

Ivor Novello Awards
The 57th Ivor Novello Awards were held on 17 May 2012 at the Grosvenor House Hotel, London.

Best Contemporary Song: "Video Games" – Lana Del Rey (written by Lana Del Rey and Justin Parker)
PRS for Music Most Performed Work: "Rolling in the Deep" – Adele (written by Adele Adkins and Paul Epworth)
Best Television Soundtrack: The Shadow Line (composed by Martin Phipps)
The Ivors Jazz Award: Stan Tracey
Album Award: Let England Shake – PJ Harvey (written by PJ Harvey)
Outstanding Song Collection: Gary Kemp
The Ivors Inspiration Award: Siouxsie Sioux
Best Original Film Score: The First Grader (composed by Alex Heffes)
PRS for Music Outstanding Contribution to British Music: Gary Barlow, Howard Donald, Jason Orange, Mark Owen and Robbie Williams (Take That)
Best Song Musically and Lyrically: "The A Team" – Ed Sheeran (written by Ed Sheeran)
Lifetime Achievement: Mark Knopfler
Songwriter of the Year: Adele Adkins
PRS for Music Special International Award: Jimmy Webb
BASCA Fellowship: Andrew Lloyd Webber

Classical BRIT Awards
The 2012 Classic BRIT Awards were held on 2 October 2012 at the Royal Albert Hall, London and were hosted by Myleene Klass.
Female Artist: Nicola Benedetti (Italia)
MasterCard Breakthrough Artist of the Year Award: Miloš Karadaglić (Latino)
Composer: John Williams (War Horse, The Adventures of Tintin: The Secret of the Unicorn)
International Artist of the Year in association with Raymond Weil: Andrea Bocelli
Critics' Award: Benjamin Grosvenor (Chopin/Liszt/Ravel)
Male Artist: Vasily Petrenko (Shostakovich/Symphony No. 1 & 3, Shostakovich/Symphony No. 6 & 12, Shostakovich/Symphony No. 2 & 15, Rachmaninov/Piano Concertos 1 & 4, Rachmaninov/Symphony No. 3)
Classic BRITs Single of the Year in association with iTunes: "Wherever You Are" – Military Wives with Gareth Malone
Lifetime Achievement Award: John Williams
Classic FM Album of the Year in association with MasterCard: And The Waltz Goes On – André Rieu

Mercury Prize
The 2012 Barclaycard Mercury Prize was awarded on 1 November 2012 to Alt-J for their album An Awesome Wave.

Popjustice £20 Music Prize 
The 2012 Popjustice £20 Music Prize was awarded on 1 November 2012 to Will Young for his single "Jealousy".

British Composer Awards
The 10th British Composer Awards were held on 3 December 2012 at Goldsmiths' Hall, London and hosted by Sara Mohr-Pietsch and Andrew McGregor.

Instrumental Solo or Duo: Learning Self-Modulation – Christian Mason
Chamber: The Four Quarters – Thomas Adès
Vocal: No Man's Land – Colin Matthews
Choral: Airplane Cantata – Gabriel Jackson
Wind Band or Brass Band: A Symphony of Colours – Simon Dobson
Orchestral: Concerto for Violin and Orchestra – Harrison Birtwistle
Stage Works: DESH – Jocelyn Pook
Liturgical: Missa Brevis – Francis Grier
Sonic Art: The Ethometric Museum – Ray Lee
Contemporary Jazz Composition: Sailing to Byzantium – Christine Tobin
Community or Educational Project: The Chimpanzees of Happytown – Paul Rissmann
Making Music Award: Mesmerism for Piano and Chamber Orchestra – Emily Howard
International Award: Concerto for Violin, Cello and Orchestra – Thomas Larcher

The Record of the Year
The 2012 Record of the Year was awarded to "Somebody That I Used to Know" by Gotye featuring Kimbra. This was the final year that The Record of the Year was awarded.

Charts and sales

Number-one singles

Number-one albums

Number-one compilation albums

Best-selling singles of 2012

Best-selling albums of 2012

Notes:

Deaths
3 January – Bob Weston, guitarist with Fleetwood Mac, 64 (gastrointestinal haemorrhage and cirrhosis of the liver)
4 January – Kerry McGregor, contestant on the third series of The X Factor, 37 (bladder cancer)
11 January – David Whitaker, English composer and conductor, 81
27 January – Ted Dicks, composer, 83
6 February – Jim King, saxophonist with Family, 69
9 February – Joe Moretti, Scottish-South African guitarist and songwriter with Nero and the Gladiators, 73
15 February – Clive Shakespeare, English-Australian guitarist, songwriter, and producer with Sherbet, 64 (cancer)
21 February – John Charles Winter, organist, 88
29 February – Davy Jones, singer and percussionist with the Monkees, 66 (heart attack)
1 March – Peter Graeme, oboist, 90
20 April – Bert Weedon, guitarist, 91
11 May – Roland Shaw, composer, arranger, and bandleader, 91
14 May – Derek Hammond-Stroud, operatic baritone, 86
20 May – Robin Gibb, singer and songwriter with the Bee Gees, 62 (liver cancer)
3 June – Andy Hamilton, Jamaican-born jazz saxophonist and composer, 94
17 June – Brian Hibbard, singer with the Flying Pickets and actor, 65 (prostate cancer)
7 July – Alf Pearson, singer and variety performer as one half of the double act Bob and Alf Pearson, 102
10 July – Lol Coxhill, saxophonist, 79
11 July – Jean Allister, opera singer, 80
16 July – Jon Lord, musician with Deep Purple and Whitesnake, and classical composer, 71 (pancreatic cancer)
23 July – Graham Jackson, conductor, 45 (cancer)
17 August – Lou Martin, keyboard player, 63
31 August – Max Bygraves, singer and variety performer, 89 (Alzheimer's disease)
2 September – John C. Marshall, jazz musician, 71
4 September – Ian Parrott, composer and academic, 96
15 September – George Hurst, conductor, 86
2 October – Big Jim Sullivan, guitarist, 71 (heart disease and diabetes)
12 October – Geraldine Mucha, composer, 95
18 November – Sir Philip Ledger, composer and academic, 74
26 October – Jo Dunne, guitarist with We've Got a Fuzzbox and We're Gonna Use It, 43 (cancer)
6 November – Clive Dunn, actor and singer, 92
18 November
Stan Greig, pianist, drummer, and bandleader, 82 (Parkinson's disease)
Sir Philip Ledger, English organist, composer, and academic, 74
20 November – Michael Dunford guitarist and songwriter with Renaissance (cerebral haemorrhage)
24 November – Ian Campbell, folk musician, 79 (cancer)
4 December – Jonathan Harvey, composer, 73 (motor neurone disease)

See also
 2012 in British radio
 2012 in British television
 2012 in the United Kingdom
 List of British films of 2012

References

 
2012